is an incomplete expressway that, upon completion, will connect the San'in Expressway from Tottori interchange to the Kyoto Jūkan Expressway. It is owned and operated by partly by the Kyoto Prefectural Road Corporation and the Ministry of Land, Infrastructure, Transport and Tourism. It is numbered "E9" along with the Kyoto Jūkan Expressway and the San-in Expressway.

Route description
As of December 2019, the San'in Kinki Expressway is an incomplete expressway linking the Kyoto Jūkan Expressway in Miyazu, Kyoto to the San'in Expressway in Tottori. It is made up of four east to west, separate sections that will eventually connect to one another upon the completion of the route.

History
The San'in Kinki Expressway was designated as a planned route on 16 December 1994. On 27 March 2005, the section between Kasumi and Satsu interchanges was the first section of the expressway to open. The next section would open on 24 November 2008, between Higashihama and Igumi interchanges. Next, the expressway was extended west from Kasumi Interchange to Amarube Interchange on 12 December 2010. On 12 March 2011, a separate eastern section of the expressway opened between Yoza-Amanohashidate Interchange and Miyazu-Amanohashidate Interchange. On 22 March 2014, the section between Fukube Interchange and Iwami Interchange opened. From Iwami Interchange, the expressway was extended east to Uratomi on 26 March 2016. On the eastern section, the expressway was extended from Yoza-Amanohashidate Interchange to Kyōtango-Ōmiya Interchange on 30 October 2016. On 26 November 2017 the expressway was extended west from Amarube Interchange to Shin'onsen-Hamasaka Interchange.

List of interchanges and features

 IC - interchange, SIC - smart interchange, JCT - junction, SA - service area, PA - parking area, TN - tunnel, TB - toll gate

See also

References

External links

Expressways in Japan
Regional High-Standard Highways in Japan
Roads in Hyōgo Prefecture
Roads in Kyoto Prefecture
Roads in Tottori Prefecture
2005 establishments in Japan